The 2011 CERS Cup Final Four was the 31st edition of the CERS Cup organized by CERH. It was held in May 2011 in Vilanova i la Geltru, within Barcelona metropolitan area, Spain.
 
After the qualification the four final clubs which participated in the final four were: SL Benfica, CP Vilanova, HC Braga and AE Física. The winner was Sport Lisboa e Benfica.

Matches

Final

External links
CERH website

International
 Roller Hockey links worldwide
 Mundook-World Roller Hockey
rink-hockey-news - World Roller Hockey

World Skate Europe Cup
CERS Cup Final Four
Roller hockey in Spain
CERS Cup Final Four
International roller hockey competitions hosted by Spain